Agung Anom (Mengwi) ( 1690–1722) was king of the Balinese Kingdom of Mengwi. Agung married a princess from the powerful northern kingdom of Buleleng, a daughter of Panji Sakti and used this alliance to extend Mengwi's dominion into Blambangan in eastern Java. He was descended from Gusti Agung, a minister of the Gelgel kingdom who had overthrown its last king in the mid-17th century.

Footnotes

References 
 

1690 births
1722 deaths
Balinese people
Indonesian Hindu monarchs
18th-century Indonesian people
17th-century Indonesian people